The 2018 Copa del Rey Final was an Association football match played on 21 April 2018 to decide the winner of the 2017–18 Copa del Rey, the 116th edition of Spain's primary football cup (including two seasons where two rival editions were played).

The match was between Sevilla and Barcelona at the Metropolitano Stadium in Madrid.

Barcelona won the final 5–0 for their 4th consecutive and 30th overall Copa del Rey title.

Background
Barcelona were competing in their 40th Copa del Rey final, extending the record of 39 which they previously shared with Real Madrid, having won 29 titles prior, a competition record. They were the reigning champions, having defeated Deportivo Alavés 3–1 in the earlier 2017 final at the Vicente Calderón in Madrid. This was their fifth consecutive final, a feat never accomplished before, and were seeking a fourth consecutive title, a record shared by Real Madrid (1905, 1906, 1907, 1908) and Athletic Bilbao (1930, 1931, 1932, 1933).

Sevilla were competing in their ninth Copa del Rey final, having won a total of five titles prior (1935, 1939, 1948, 2007, and 2010).

The pairing was a rematch from the 2016 final, where Barcelona won 2–0 after extra time.

Route to the final

Match

Details

References

Copa del Rey Final
2018
Copa Del Rey Final 2018
Copa del Rey Final 2018
Copa del Rey
Football in Madrid
2018 in Madrid
Sports competitions in Madrid